Olginate is a comune (municipality) in the Province of Lecco in the Italian region Lombardy, located about  northeast of Milan and about  south of Lecco.

The municipality of Olginate contains the frazione (subdivision) Consonno.

Olginate borders the following municipalities: Airuno, Brivio, Calolziocorte, Galbiate, Garlate, Valgreghentino, Vercurago.

It is served by Calolziocorte-Olginate railway station.

Demographic evolution

References

External links
 www.comune.olginate.lc.it/

Cities and towns in Lombardy